Julia Weise (born 19 January 2000) is a German handballer who plays for HC Leipzig.

In September 2018, she was included by EHF in a list of the twenty best young handballers to watch for the future.

Individual awards 
 Thüringer Allgemeine Sportswoman of the Year: 2014

References
 

  
2000 births 
Living people
German female handball players